Madhavaram, is a village in NTR district in the state of Andhra Pradesh in India.

Demographics

References 

Villages in NTR district